La Cumbrecita is a small hamlet  above sea level in the Calamuchita Valley in the Grand Sierras of Córdoba, Argentina. A  paved road through the Sierra Grandes connects to it from the main road to the provincial capital.

There is a river called Medio that borders La Cumbrecita and it is the edge of Santa Mara County. According to the INDEC 2001 census, there were 189 people living in La Cumbrecita and 156 in Calamuchita, which makes for a total of 345 people. In La Cumbrecita, there are 140 households that are counted. In each county, there are 97 and 43 people.

Geography

Excursions to La Cumbrecita can be taken from nearby Villa General Belgrano, founded by the crew of the German cruiser Admiral Graf Spee.

The town is organized as a commune. It was founded on 9 September 1934, when the Cabjolsky family bought  of land, and brothers Enrique and Federico Behrend started their pioneer work. The residents planted pine trees and transformed the countryside into an Alpine environment. Local residents made the road to Los Reartes and constructed the first houses.

Tourism
Tourism started in 1937, and around 1940 the first private homes were built in La Cumbrecita

Populated by central European immigrants, the town is focused on eco-tourism and is designed completely for pedestrians. This town offers a range of hotels, lodges, and cabins that are decorated in an alpine style. There is a museum in the town that is dedicated to minerals that have been found in the area.

The communal authorities declared the zone a protected environment and as of 1996 a "Pedestrian Town". Visitors must park their cars in the parking lot before entering the town.

See also

 Villa General Belgrano
 List of largest cuckoo clocks

References

External links

 La Cumbrecita.info
 La Cumbrecita.gov.ar

Cumbrecita
Populated places established in 1934
Tourism in Argentina
German-Argentine culture
1934 establishments in Argentina
Cities in Argentina
Argentina
Córdoba Province, Argentina